This is the list of äkıms of Karaganda Region that have held the position since 1992.

List of Äkıms 

 Pyotr Nefyodov (6 February 1992 – 4 July 1997)
 Mäjit Esenbaev (4 July 1997 – 12 October 1999)
 Kamaltin Mūhamedjanov (13 October 1999 – 19 January 2006)
 Nūrlan Nyğmatulin (19 January 2006 – 19 November 2009)
 Serık Ahmetov (19 November 2009 – 20 January 2012)
 Äbılğazy Qūsaiynov (20 January 2012 – 28 January 2013)
 Bauyrjan Äbdışev (29 January 2013 – 20 June 2014)
 Nūrmūhambet Äbdıbekov (20 June 2014 – 14 March 2017)
 Erlan Qoşanov (14 March 2017 – 18 September 2019)
 Jeñıs Qasymbek (19 September 2019 – present)

References 

Government of Kazakhstan